SS Sant′ Anna was a Transatlantic ocean liner converted into a troopship in 1915, torpedoed and sunk in the Mediterranean Sea on 11 May 1918 with 605 casualties.

Sant′ Anna was built as an ocean liner for service between France and New York City. The ship was operational between 1912 and 1915, when she was requisitioned by the French Army and refitted as troopship for use in World War I. On 19 September 1915 a fire broke out on board, which was thought to be an act of German sabotage. On 12 April 1916 Sant′ Anna made her first trip to the Salonika front with 1,027 Serbian Army soldiers and 129 horses on board.

She was torpedoed at 3:15 AM by the Imperial German Navy submarine SM UC-54, commanded by Heinrich XXXVII Prinz Reuß zu Köstritz, and sank at 3:58 AM off the coast of French Tunisia, some 26 nautical miles east of Cape Bon, killing 605 of the soldiers. The survivors were rescued by the two British sloops, the French Navy destroyer Catapulte, a British gunboat, the French sloop Saint Jean, and the vessels Auguste Leblond and Marguerite Marie.

See also
List by death toll of ships sunk by submarines

Sources

 Navires 14-18
 Technical data, pictures, lists of names  
 Wreck site
 

1910 ships
Maritime incidents in 1915
Ship fires
Maritime incidents in 1918
Passenger ships of France
Ships built in France
Ships sunk by German submarines in World War I
World War I shipwrecks in the Mediterranean Sea